Events from the year 1998 in Iran.

Incumbents
 Supreme Leader: Ali Khamenei
 President: Mohammad Khatami 
 Vice President: Hassan Habibi
 Chief Justice: Mohammad Yazdii

Events

Sports

 1997–98 Iranian Basketball League Division One.

Establishments

 Islamic Iran Participation Front.

See also
 Years in Iraq
 Years in Afghanistan

References

 
Iran
Years of the 20th century in Iran
1990s in Iran
Iran